Tonga sent a delegation to compete at the 2000 Summer Paralympics in Sydney, Australia. The country was represented by a single athlete, Alailupe Valeti (also referred to as Alailupe Tualau), who competed in the discus and in the shot put, in events for visually impaired athletes. It was Tonga's first participation in the Paralympic Games.

Athletics

See also
Tonga at the Paralympics
Tonga at the 2000 Summer Olympics

References 

Nations at the 2000 Summer Paralympics
2000
Summer Paralympics